Hesar-e Isa (also Romanized as Ḩeşār-e ‘Īsá; also known as Ḩeşār) is a village in Shoqan Rural District, Jolgeh Shoqan District, Jajrom County, North Khorasan Province, Iran. At the 2006 census, its population was 592, in 154 families.

References 

Populated places in Jajrom County